|}
Terence Robert McCarthy (born 26 January 1940) is an Australian former politician. He was a Country Liberal Party member of the Northern Territory Legislative Assembly from 1983 to 2001, representing Victoria River until 1990 and Goyder afterwards. He was Speaker at the time of his retirement.

References

1940 births
Living people
Members of the Northern Territory Legislative Assembly
Country Liberal Party members of the Northern Territory Legislative Assembly
21st-century Australian politicians